"I Couldn't See You Leavin'" is a song written by Ronnie Scaife and Rory Bourke, and recorded by American country music artist Conway Twitty.  It was released in December 1990 as the second single from his album Crazy in Love.  The song reached #3 on the Billboard Hot Country Singles & Tracks chart in 1991. It was Conway's final Top 10 hit.

Chart performance

Year-end charts

References

1990 singles
Conway Twitty songs
Songs written by Rory Bourke
Song recordings produced by Jimmy Bowen
MCA Records singles
Songs written by Ronny Scaife
1990 songs